Maciej Lepiato (born 18 August 1988 in Poznań) is a Polish Paralympic athlete who was born with a disability affecting his left leg. He took up the sport in 2010 and trains in both high jump and long jump. He won gold in men's high jump - F46 at the 2012 and 2016 Summer Paralympics.

References 

1988 births
Living people
Sportspeople from Gorzów Wielkopolski
Paralympic athletes of Poland
Paralympic gold medalists for Poland
Paralympic bronze medalists for Poland
Athletes (track and field) at the 2012 Summer Paralympics
Athletes (track and field) at the 2016 Summer Paralympics
Athletes (track and field) at the 2020 Summer Paralympics
Medalists at the 2012 Summer Paralympics
Medalists at the 2016 Summer Paralympics
Medalists at the 2020 Summer Paralympics
Paralympic medalists in athletics (track and field)
World Para Athletics Championships winners
Polish male high jumpers